Günter Schroers (born 11 January 1939) is a retired German rower who specialized in the coxless fours. In this event he won three medals at European championships of 1959–1964 and finished in sixth place at the 1964 Summer Olympics.

References

1939 births
Living people
West German male rowers
Olympic rowers of the United Team of Germany
Rowers at the 1964 Summer Olympics
Rowers at the 1960 Summer Olympics
People from Flensburg
European Rowing Championships medalists
Sportspeople from Schleswig-Holstein